Mark Alan Ibold (born October 17, 1962) is an American musician. He is best known as the bass guitarist of the indie rock band Pavement, with whom he recorded four studio albums. Following Pavement's initial break-up in 1999, Ibold joined the alternative rock band Sonic Youth from 2006 until their end in 2011.

Career 
Based in New York, Ibold's other musical projects have included Dustdevils, of which he was a member in the late 1980s and early 1990s, and Free Kitten, which included Sonic Youth's Kim Gordon, Pussy Galore's Julie Cafritz and  Boredoms' Yoshimi P-We.

In 2006, Ibold joined Sonic Youth on their Rather Ripped tour, and as of their 2009 album The Eternal, was a full participating member of the band until they split up in 2011.

Other activities
Ibold was a bartender at "Great Jones Cafe" in New York City until its closure.

He was listed in the closing credits as "Wardrobe Assistant" on the Comedy Central's Strangers with Candy, and has made several cameo appearances on the show. In 2006, he was published as the "male hand model" in Strangers with Candy star Amy Sedaris' book I Like You: Hospitality Under the Influence.

In the late 2010s his food columns could be read in David Chang's now defunct Lucky Peach magazine.

At the time of Pavement's 2022 reunion, Ibold was working as a bartender in New York City: "My mind races sometimes when people come up to me at work. What are they thinking? 'Oh God, this guy’s been in two bands that mean the world to me, but he’s serving drinks behind a bar?' Maybe we help put things into perspective – that there are few artists left not named Jagger or McCartney who have no financial worries. But still: I’d drop my shifts for Pavement any day of the week."

Discography
with Pavement
 Watery, Domestic (EP) (1992)
 Crooked Rain, Crooked Rain (1994)
 Wowee Zowee (1995)
 Brighten the Corners (1997)
 Terror Twilight (1999)

with Sonic Youth
 The Eternal (2009)

with Free Kitten
 Unboxed (1994)
 Nice Ass (1995)
 Sentimental Education (1997)

References 

1962 births
Living people
American rock bass guitarists
American male bass guitarists
American indie rock musicians
Noise rock musicians
Pavement (band) members
Sonic Youth members
20th-century American guitarists
Lancaster Country Day School alumni
Free Kitten members
Dustdevils members